Norman's Retreat is a historic home and farm complex at Galesville, Anne Arundel County, Maryland.  It consists of an early-19th-century dwelling, three 19th-century outbuildings, and a bath house and gazebo of recent date. The -story house was constructed about 1812 and is of frame construction with a brick gable end.

It was listed on the National Register of Historic Places in 1984.

References

External links
, including photo from 1974, at Maryland Historical Trust

Houses on the National Register of Historic Places in Maryland
Houses in Anne Arundel County, Maryland
National Register of Historic Places in Anne Arundel County, Maryland